Eric San (born December 5, 1974), aka Kid Koala, is a Canadian scratch DJ, music producer, theatre producer, film composer, multimedia-performer and visual artist. His career began as a scratch DJ in 1994. Kid Koala works with genres as eclectic as hip hop, ambient, alternative, contemporary classical, blues, classic rock and traditional jazz. He has released 5 solo albums on Ninja Tune, and 3 albums on Arts & Crafts Records, the most recent being Music To Draw To: IO featuring Trixie Whitley. He has also released two award-winning graphic novels: Nufonia Must Fall and Space Cadet. He has collaborated with artists such as Gorillaz, Deltron 3030, The Slew, Lovage, and The Afiara String Quartet.

Kid Koala has toured with Radiohead, the Beastie Boys, Arcade Fire, Money Mark, A Tribe Called Quest, Mike Patton, DJ Shadow and The Preservation Hall Jazz Band. He has contributed to scores for the films The Great Gatsby, Baby Driver, Scott Pilgrim vs. The World, Men Women and Children, Shaun of the Dead and Looper amongst others. He has composed music for The National Film Board of Canada, the Cartoon Network, Sesame Street and Adult Swim. He has also been commissioned to create music for runway shows for Belgian fashion designer Dries Van Noten.

Kid Koala's live shows range from touring turntable carnivals like Vinyl Vaudeville, to immersive multimedia shows like Nufonia Must Fall, The Storyville Mosquito, Satellite Turntable Orchestra and his Space Cadet Headphone Concert; each of which express his unique form of storytelling with music, animation, film and interactive entertainment.

Kid Koala has toured 6 continents and lives with his wife and two daughters in Montreal, Canada.

Early life and education
San attended Sir Winston Churchill Secondary School in Vancouver, British Columbia, Canada, but graduated from Thomas Sprigg Wootton High School, in Rockville, Maryland, U.S., and went on to study elementary education at McGill University, in Montreal, Quebec.

Career
San began by distributing copies of his demo tape Scratchcratchratchatch to students living in residence at McGill. He is well known for his enigmatic style of turntablism, which uses an unusual collection of samples. He has used samples of music from Charlie Brown television specials, old comedy sketch routines (including those that mock turntablism), people sneezing, and people reading a menu in Cantonese.

In 2000, San released his album, Carpal Tunnel Syndrome. He designed and illustrated the cover for this and his later albums. A comic book he drew is included as the liner notes. Following the release of the album, Kid Koala embarked on an extensive tour, during which he opened for a number of musicians, including Radiohead and Björk. The cabaret-style tour throughout North America, Europe and Australia, known as The Short Attention Span Theatre, featured an unpredictable opening act—three Djs (Kid Koala, P-Love, and DJ Jester the Filipino Fist) on eight turntables set up like a band, and a bingo game at intermission among other quirky surprises. Following this tour Kid Koala has performed DJ sets in Asia, as well as in Iceland, Eastern Europe, Russia, and South America whilst working on a new book and a multimedia puppet show.

San released a full-length graphic novel, Nufonia Must Fall, which includes a soundtrack CD he composed. Some of my Best Friends are DJs includes a chess set as part of the packaging.

San popularized a method of playing the turntable like a melodic instrument, where a long, single note is dragged under the needle at different speeds, creating different pitches. Since this method of adjusting pitch is imprecise, the resulting notes waver and bend. Thus, in the song "Drunk Trumpet," San uses this method with a trumpet note to simulate a drunken trumpet player, interspersing drunken vocals to complete the effect. When playing live, San often uses records cut with custom sounds from which he creates his own songs.

During San Diego Comic-Con 2010, Kid Koala performed before a special free showing of the movie Scott Pilgrim vs. the World. The next year at Comic-Con, he performed before a special premiere of the television series NTSF:SD:SUV::.

In June 2013, his studio album 12 bit Blues was longlisted for the 2013 Polaris Music Prize.

In June 2014, the Kid Koala's Nufonia Must Fall Live made its world premiere at Toronto's Luminato Festival. Directed by K.K. Barrett, (Oscar-nominee for Her), this live adaptation of the graphic novel unfolds via a real-time filming of more than a dozen miniature stages, a full crew and cast of puppets. San and the Afiara Quartet provide live scoring on piano, strings and turntables. San also has another project debuting at Luminato Festival entitled The Lost Train, a collaboration between San and Joe Beef's Chef Frédéric Morin. The two joined to create a series of "imaginary journeys with real food and music", inspired by their respective passion for trains. Taking place at a secret location, the experience will remain a mystery with the guests being taken to an undisclosed location, and will feature a specially created course by Morin and a live set of entirely new material by Kid Koala.

In early 2017, San released an album, Music to Draw To: Satellite, in collaboration with Icelandic singer Emilíana Torrini. He released a follow-up in early 2019, Music to Draw To: Io, in collaboration with Belgian singer Trixie Whitley.

Discography

Solo projects

Albums
 1996: Scratchcratchratchatch - mixtape demo album, limited to 500 copies and initially released on cassette only.
 2000: Carpal Tunnel Syndrome
2003: Nufonia Must Fall
 2003: Some of My Best Friends Are DJs
 2006: Your Mom's Favorite DJ
 2012: 12 Bit Blues
 2017:  Music to Draw To: Satellite
2018: Floor Kids Original Video Game Soundtrack
 2019: Music to Draw To: Io

EPs and singles
 1996: Scratchappyland (selections from Scratchcratchratchatch)
 2000: Emperor's Main Course in Cantonese
 2003: Basin Street Blues
 2012: 2 bit Blues x 6 bit Blues
 2017: "Collapser" (featuring Emilíana Torrini)
 2018: "All For You" (featuring Trixie Whitley)
 2018: "Allotropic"

DVDs
 2005: Live from the Short Attention Span Audio Theater Tour!! - 5 track live EP with accompanying DVD containing the video of the live performance plus 4 Music videos

Books
 2003: Nufonia Must Fall - Graphic novel with accompanying 17 minute audio CD (ECW Press)
 2011: Space Cadet - Graphic novel with accompanying soundtrack CD (Uni Books)

Mixtape
2010: Solid Steel: Music To Draw To...

Remixes
1997: Coldcut - More Beats And Pieces  (Obsessive Behaviour Version)
1998: DJ Vadim - Vad Forgive Me (Bullfrog Kid Koala Mix)
2001: Kalyanji-Anandji - Third World Lover (Kid Koala and Dynamite D remix)
2002: Fog - Check Fraud (Kid Koala's Space Cadet E002 Mix)
2002: Dan the Automator - Untitled (Feat. Damon Albarn , Mos Def ) (Kid Koala Remix)
2003: Amon Tobin - Untitled with Kid Koala
2004: Lederhosen Lucil - Semi-Sweet
2004: Noveltones - The Gonk
2005: The Free Design - An Elegy (Kid Koala and Dynamite D remix)
2005: Yusef Lateef - Bamboo Flute Blues (Kid Koala Remix)
2007: Pierre Lapointe - 25-1-14-14
2008: Jack Johnson - Angel
2009: Bell Orchestre - Icicles / Bicycles (Kid Koala Remix)
2011: Amon Tobin - Ruthless (Kid Koala Remix)
2013: Emeli Sandé and the Bryan Ferry Orchestra - Crazy In Love (Kid Koala Version)
2013: Trixie Whitley - Irene (Kid Koala Remix)

Appearances
2001: Gorillaz - Gorillaz (Parlophone)
2004: Handsome Boy Modeling School - White People (Elektra)
2006: Peeping Tom (band) - s/t (Ipecac Recordings)
2007: Josh Haden - Devoted (Diamond Soul Recordings)
2014: MC Frontalot - Question Bedtime (Level Up Records & Tapes)

Group projects
 1998: Bullfrog - Bullfrog Theme (Independent)
1998: Ninja Tune - Ninja Cuts: Funkungfusion (Ninja Tune)
 2000: Bullfrog - EP1 (Independent)
 2000: Bullfrog - EP2 (Independent)
 2000: Deltron 3030 - Deltron 3030 (75 Ark)
 2000: Deltron 3030 - Virus (75 Ark)
 2001: Deltron 3030 - Deltron 3030: The Instrumentals (75 Ark)
 2001: Deltron 3030 - Positive Contact (75 Ark)
 2001: Lovage - Music to Make Love to Your Old Lady By (75 Ark)
 2001: Lovage - Music To Make Love To Your Old Lady By: The Instrumentals (75 Ark)
 2001: Bullfrog - s/t (Ropeadope Records)
 2004: Bullfrog / Robertson - Deeper Shade of Green (Independent)
 2007: Martin Tétreault & Kid Koala - s/t (Phon-O-Victo)
 2009: The Slew - 100% (Puget Sounds)
 2013: Deltron 3030 - Event 2 (Bulk Recordings)

Video games 

 2013: BattleBlock Theater
 2017: Hololabs Studio Inc. - Floor Kids
 2021: Ubisoft - Riders Republic

Film

Composer
2005: Strum (short) - Original music 
2005: A Girl's Guide to Modern Dating (short) - Original music 
2006: Jaime Lo, Small and Shy (short) - Original music 
2017: 3 Amigonauts (TV series) - Theme music composer

Contributor
2010: Scott Pilgrim vs. the World  (feature) - Contributor to the original score 
2013: The Great Gatsby
2017: Baby Driver - Contributor to the original score

See also
 Lovage (band)
 List of Quebec musicians
 Music of Quebec
 Peeping Tom (album)
 Deltron 3030
 The Slew

References

External links

 Kid Koala discography at Discogs
 
 

1974 births
Canadian electronic musicians
Living people
Musicians from Montreal
Musicians from Vancouver
Ninja Tune artists
Canadian musicians of Chinese descent
McGill University Faculty of Education alumni
Trip hop musicians
Lovage (band) members
Canadian DJs
Canadian hip hop DJs
Canadian record producers
Deltron 3030 members